Nutfield railway station is on the Redhill to Tonbridge Line and serves Nutfield, Surrey, England. It is about a mile south of Nutfield itself, located in South Nutfield, a settlement which did not exist before the coming of the railway. It is  measured from  via .

Since  2008 the station, and all trains serving it, have been operated by Southern, following the ending of the previous Southeastern service.

History

Nutfield station opened on that line on 1 January 1884, although a public siding named 'Mid Street' had been provided here from an early date.
 
The station buildings were similar in style to those at Sandling Junction, although no footbridge was provided at Nutfield. The buildings were demolished in the late 1960s.  Until electrification all passengers crossed the lines at rail level at the Western end of platforms, close to the signal box.

For many years a private siding from Nutfield station served the chemical works of the Nutfield Manufacturing Company, situated Southwest of the station on the site of a former brickworks.

Goods facilities were withdrawn in January 1966, and coal traffic ceased in November of that year.  Full-time staffing ended on 5 November 1967 but staff was frequently provided at morning commuter peak hours until around 1990.  The signal box remained in use until 10 May 1970.

In 1993 the line was electrified and services started to run through to London rather than being an extension of the Reading to Tonbridge North Downs Line service.

Station facilities 

The two platforms are now linked by a footbridge.

Trains heading to Tonbridge have an information board displaying the next train details, and in May 2011 an information board was installed on Platform 1 which heads to Redhill and London.

In 2008, a PERTIS machine was installed at this station at the entrance to the Redhill-bound platform.

Services
All services at Nutfield are operated by Southern using Class 377 EMUs. 

The typical off-peak service in trains per hour is:
 1 tph to 
 1 tph to 

Services increase to 2 tph in each direction during the peak hours.

References

External links

Railway stations in Surrey
DfT Category F2 stations
Former South Eastern Railway (UK) stations
Railway stations in Great Britain opened in 1884
Railway stations served by Govia Thameslink Railway